Someswari Brahma Literary Award is given each year, since 1993, by Bodo Sahitya Sabha, to writers and their works, for their best creative writings in Bodo Literature. Someswari Award is given out of the amount of Rs. 55, 000/- donated by Trailokya Brahma of Patakata. The Award carries an amount of Rs. 5,000/- with citation.

Recipients

References

Bodo
Indian literary awards  
1993 establishments in India
Awards established in 1993
Poetry awards
Fiction awards
Short story awards